Calamotropha arachnophagus is a moth in the family Crambidae. It was described by Embrik Strand in 1918. It is found in Taiwan.

References

Crambinae
Moths described in 1918